Matrix planting is a form of self-sustaining gardening, with a focus on attractive plantings that are often purely ornamental, but can include food-bearing and medicinal plants.

The idea

Matrix planting is based on matching plant to space. The idea is that, when done successfully, plants replace spades, rakes, and hoes as the controllers of what goes on in the garden.

Wildflowers grow all over the world with no help from humans. They are successful because the plants within each plant community have established a balance with one another: they each obtain a share of resources, living space, and opportunities to reproduce.

Matrix planting is based on this natural model. It aims to set up similar self-sustaining communities in gardens, by bringing together plants that meld with one another in a balance: all survive and flourish; weeds are excluded.

Matrix planting is based on choosing and managing plants in ways which enable them to form similar matrices in the garden. The aim is to enable the plants to occupy the ground and the space above it so effectively that no space is left for weeds and to do this in ways that are decorative and sympathetic to the setting of the garden. 

The aim of matrix planting is 1) encourage the plants you do want, and 2) discourage the plants you do not want. The key to success lies in the choice of plants. Ill-judged choices result in excessive dominance by one or two species, and the disappearance of those that cannot cope. Well judged choices lead to the establishment of persistent communities of plants which are diverse, self-renewing, resistant to invasion by weeds, and look attractive. It is not possible to plant and walk away as matrices take time to develop and depend on positive, rather than neutral, management. 

The strongest matrices consist of a succession of layers of vegetation through which sunlight filters, until at ground level there is enough only to support plants that can cope with very little light. The best examples of such matrices occur in deciduous woodlands, but that does not mean all gardens have to become micro-forests—effective matrices can also be formed by shrubs and perennials in mixed borders. 

Some may argue that matrix planting is just another term for ground cover, but matrix planting is concerned with successive layers of vegetation, one above the other, through which plants form multi-dimensional communities. Few would refer to the stratified vegetation of a wood as ground cover, though seen from a bird’s-eye view the cover is most effective. 

The essential quality of a plant matrix is the occupation of space, and matrix planting draws inspiration from the ways plants grow together naturally yet it is not a mere imitation of nature.

Related ideas

The ideas of matrix planting are similar to aspects of permaculture, with its focus on using "guilds" of plants as part of "layered" or "stacked" garden designs, coming together to form a perennial polyculture that is largely self-sustaining. Permaculture also draws on the idea that in nature, ecosystems by and large have no trouble sustaining themselves, and that these systems can be replicated by human gardeners.

In the same way, many organic farmers and gardeners draw upon the idea of polyculture, and that plants can work together to form a strong community that requires little to no human intervention. The idea is that an increased diversity of well-selected species inhabiting the same space will make the plant community healthier and less maintenance-intensive—that is, dogged by a minimum of weeds, insect pests, soil infertility, need for watering, etc.

See also
 Forest gardening
 Masanobu Fukuoka
 No-till farming
 Organic gardening
 Permaculture
 Polyculture

References

Notes

Bibliography

External links
Thompson, Peter. The Self-Sustaining Garden: A Gardener's Guide to Matrix Planting. Timber Press: Portland, 2007 

Horticulture